Legislative elections were held in Argentina on 1 March 1936. The National Democratic Party remained the largest faction, with 55 of the 158 seats, despite receiving far fewer votes than the Radical Civic Union. Voter turnout was 70.9%.

Results

Results by province

References

1936 elections in South America
1936 in Argentina
Elections in Argentina
Infamous Decade
March 1936 events